"All Through the Night" is a 1934 popular song written by Cole Porter for his 1934 musical Anything Goes. The melody's distinguishing characteristic is a descending chromatic scale, starting on the third, interrupted by an octave leap after four bars. It was introduced by William Gaxton and Betina Hume.
Hit versions in 1935 were recorded by Paul Whiteman (vocal by Bob Lawrence) and by Harry Rosenthal (vocal by Helen Ward).

Other notable recordings
Bing Crosby - Anything Goes soundtrack (1956)
Ella Fitzgerald - Ella Fitzgerald Sings the Cole Porter Songbook (1956)
Julie London - All Through the Night: Julie London Sings the Choicest of Cole Porter (1965)
Johnny Mathis - Wonderful, Wonderful (1957)
Johnnie Ray – ′Til Morning (1958)
Andy Williams – In the Arms of Love (1966)
Sampled by The Prodigy on the title track of their album The Day Is My Enemy (2015).

References

External links
Jazzstandards link

1934 songs
Songs written by Cole Porter
Johnny Mathis songs
Andy Williams songs
Songs from Anything Goes